Bada Kaji Manik Lal Rajbhandari (born 1880, date of death unknown) was a Nepalese politician. He served as Minister for Public Works, Communication, Law & Parliamentary Affairs, Health and Local Self Governance in the Advisory Council government from the August 1952 until June 1953.
Kaji Manik Lal Rajbhandari was the father of Late Mananiya Shree Ganapat Lal Rajbhandari and Late Mrs.Manik Laxmi Amatya who had two children, Mr. Mrigendra Bahadur Amatya and Ms Sarojini Lata Amatya.

Education
Bada Kaji Manik lal Rajbhandari is the first graduate of Nepal. He obtained his  Degree in Bachelor of Arts from the St. Xavier's College, Kolkata, affiliated with the University of Calcutta (CU), in the year 1906.

Work
 Minister for Public Works, Communication, Law & Parliamentary Affairs, Health and Local Self Governance in the Advisory Council Government, August 1952 – June 1953.
 First Secretary of Nepal Embassy in London/Great Britain, at the time of Shova Jung, 1945.
 He was a philatelist and numismatist.

History
He is mentioned in Tribhuwan's Political Experiments Chapter as one of the Councilor in the Royal Councilor's Government of 1952–53, in the book Democratic Innovations in Nepal.

Personal life
He is believed to be amongst the first to own a car in Nepal. The model was identified as the Austin. He also brought one of the first cinema projectors, wireless gramophones, typewriters, microscopes, and telescopes to Nepal.
The residence used by the Late Bada Kaji Manik Lal Rajbhandari is located in Kwalkhu, Mangalbazar in Lalitpur district of Kathmandu Valley and has recently been named as The Graduate Centenary House, in honour of the hundred-plus years since his graduation from  St. Xaviers College, Calcutta. The house since has been the residence for his family members.

Titles
 Bada Kaji
 Bada Hakim
 Sardar
 Minister

Honors
 Gorkha Dakshina Bahu First

References

Government ministers of Nepal
1880 births
Year of death missing
University of Calcutta alumni